"She Thinks My Tractor's Sexy" is a song written by Jim Collins and Paul Overstreet and recorded by American country music artist Kenny Chesney.  It was released on October 4, 1999 as the third single from Chesney's 1999 album Everywhere We Go.  The song peaked at number 11 on the US Billboard Hot Country Songs chart in early 2000, and was certified Gold by the RIAA. The song remains one of Chesney's most popular.

Content
"She Thinks My Tractor's Sexy" is an uptempo tune set in the key of B major with a vocal range from B to F. The song describes a man who is working on a farm and driving a tractor "in the hot summer sun". He describes himself as being attractive to a female who "thinks [his] tractor's sexy".

Music video
The music video was directed by Martin Kahan, and premiered on CMT on October 14, 1999, during "The CMT Delivery Room". The video shows Chesney as a farmer riding on a John Deere tractor. A woman walks in the field wearing sunglasses and a black dress, as well as a cowboy hat and jeans dancing in the barn. Throughout the video, Chesney was singing with an old fashioned microphone in a barn, with a John Deere tractor behind him, as well as a woman dancing with Chesney in the barn. At the end of the video, Chesney and a woman are sitting on a water trough, splashing water with a cowboy hat.

Chart performance
"She Thinks My Tractor's Sexy" first charted on the Billboard Hot Country Singles & Tracks chart as an album cut, reaching number 72 on the week of June 26, 1999. It re-entered the charts at number 75 on the week of August 14, 1999, then fell out and re-entered again at number 74 on September 4. Its last re-entry was at number 67 on September 25, 1999, spending a total of 21 weeks on the US country chart and peaking at number 11.

Certifications

Parodies
Cledus T. Judd parodied the song as "My Cellmate Thinks I'm Sexy" on his 2000 album Just Another Day in Parodies. This parody referenced Chesney's and Tim McGraw's June 2000 arrests after stealing a Mounted Reserve deputy's horse. Released as a single late that year, Judd's parody reached number 61 on the country charts.

On Chesney's 2004 song "When the Sun Goes Down", guest vocalist Uncle Kracker sings the line "She thinks Kracker's sexy".

Use in media
This song is used in the Rock Band Country Track Pack. 
This song is sung by Colt in the Netflix-original sitcom The Ranch on the first-season episode three.

References

1999 singles
1999 songs
Kenny Chesney songs
Songs written by Jim Collins (singer)
Songs written by Paul Overstreet
Song recordings produced by Buddy Cannon
Song recordings produced by Norro Wilson
BNA Records singles